Zakiev is a surname. Notable people with the surname include:

 Ayrat Zakiev, Russian Paralympic powerlifter
 Mirfatyh Zakiev (born 1928), scholar of Türkology
 Radik Zakiev (born 1986), Russian ice hockey forward